San Nicola di Bari can refer to :

 Saint Nicholas, whose bones were moved to Bari from Myra in modern-day Turkey, in 1087
 Basilica di San Nicola, the church in Bari built to house the saint's relics
San Nicola di Bari, Randazzo church
San Nicola di Bari, Bomporto church
San Nicola di Bari, Sestola church
San Nicola di Bari, Pozzaglia Sabina church